NGC 3710 is an elliptical galaxy in the constellation Leo.  William Herschel discovered it on 10 April 1785.

One supernova has been observed in NGC 3710:  SN 2023bbp (Type Ia, mag 15.8).

References

External links 
 

Leo (constellation)
Elliptical galaxies
3710